The Peterborough Psalter is a name given to two different illuminated manuscripts psalters produced in the scriptorium of Peterborough Abbey. One, from the early 13th century, is now in the Fitzwilliam Museum, Cambridge; the other, from the early 14th century, in the Royal Library of Belgium.

Cambridge
The Peterborough Psalter in Cambridge was perhaps produced for Robert of Lindsey, abbot of Peterborough 1214–1222.

Brussels

The Peterborough Psalter in Brussels was produced for Abbot Godfrey of Croyland (died 1321).

References

Illuminated psalters
13th-century illuminated manuscripts
14th-century illuminated manuscripts
Manuscripts of the Fitzwilliam Museum
Manuscripts in the Royal Library of Belgium